The 1997 FINA Diving World Cup was held in Mexico City, Mexico from September 10, 1997 to September 14, 1997.

Medal winners

Men

Women

References
 "FINA Diving Results"

External links
 www.fina.org/

FINA Diving World Cup
Fina Diving World Cup
Fina Diving World Cup
Diving competitions in Mexico
Sports competitions in Mexico City
International aquatics competitions hosted by Mexico